Collidosuchus is an extinct genus of archegosauroidean temnospondyl within the family Archegosauridae.

References

Permian temnospondyls
Fossils of Russia
Fossil taxa described in 1986
Prehistoric amphibian genera